Erik Arushanian (born 20 January 1999) is a Ukrainian freestyle wrestler of Armenian descent who competes at 65 kilograms. Arushanian claimed a bronze medal from the 2020 European Championships and is the reigning U23 European Continental champion. In 2019, he became the Junior World Champion at 70 kilos, after claiming a bronze medal from the Junior World Championships in 2018.

He competed in the 65kg event at the 2022 World Wrestling Championships held in Belgrade, Serbia.

Achievements

References

External links 
 

Living people
Ukrainian people of Armenian descent
1999 births
Place of birth missing (living people)
Ukrainian male sport wrestlers
European Wrestling Championships medalists
20th-century Ukrainian people
21st-century Ukrainian people